Kotli Loharan  is a small town in Sialkot District, Pakistan. K. L industry used to manufacture mine-laying machines, hydraulic jacks and instruments for F-86 aircraft engine maintenance for the Pakistan Army. A rural hospital funds were raised, a veterinary hospital, boys and girls colleges, schools and roads have been constructed. Bazaars have been widened in 2010, Fresh water filtration plants have been installed in various locations. New Building of veterinary Hospital constructed, Streets are cemented, Rural Hospital new building constructed and upgraded, Ring roads are made. 

Kotli Loharan is a small town now, almost under the shadow of the Himalayas. It is a  thriving industrial town in the middle of agricultural land. For centuries the town has been an enclave of industry in the middle of agriculture. The people of the town  were sword smiths, and it is said that this village was a kind of a land grant, in recognition of their services. Now the swords are no longer important but surgical instruments still are there. People of this town is living in Commonwealth countries, Middle East and UK. Majority of the original population of this town have been moved to the big cities in Pakistan and overseas, especially in Kenya and UK. Current population is mix of new migrants from Jammu and Kashmir (1948 Kashmir War) and old population.

Kotli Loharan consists of two subtowns. One is Kotli Loharan West (Laandi (meaning West) Kotli) and other is called Kotli Lohraran East (Chardi (meaning East) Kotli). Many kinds of articles for use and ornament are made, such as shields and arms, betel-nut cutters, knives, boxes, plates, inkstands, and so on. The material used is iron, and gold and silver are used in inlaying.

Geography and climate 

Lying between 32°35′ North latitude and 74°29′ East longitude at an altitude of 256 m above sea level, the Chenab River flows on the northern side of Kotli Loharan just 10 kilometers from the town. 
Koti Loharan is cold during winters and hot and humid during summers. May and June are the hottest months. The temperature during winter may drop to 0 °C. The land is, generally, plain and fertile. Most of the rain falls during the Monsoon season in summer. Now the climatic changes have occurred. The summer is getting much hotter than before. The raining has also decreased significantly during the past two years.

Transport

Airport
Sialkot International Airport is just 10-08 kilometers from Kotli Loharan. Sialkot International Airport is the first ever private sector Airport of Pakistan managed by SIAL. It is noted for having the longest runway in Pakistan, is located near Sambrial. Direct flights are available from Sialkot International Airport to Karachi, Faisalabad and Kuwait. PIA would start non-stop flight between Sialkot to Manchester and Dubai as well as Hajj flights from Sialkot International Airport in 2008. Emirates is also expected to start its flights in mid-2008 to Dubai. Airblue will operate domestically from Islamabad, Multan and Karachi in mid-2008. There is also a small Sialkot Cantonment Airport in Sialkot Cantt in use by the aviation wing of the Pakistan Army. During 1995-1996 this airport was also used as a public airport by PIA for Helicopter Service from Sialkot to Islamabad. Air Arabia (National airline of Sharjah, UAE) has started their service from January 13, 2012 daily flight from Sharjah to Sialkot.

Local buses
Local bus services for Kotli Loharan operate from Sialkot main bus station towards Marala Headworks. Kotli Loharan is in the middle of this bus route.

Education
There are public as well as private school  stuitated at Kotli Loharan. There are two Govt. middle schools separate for boys and girls, Govt Intermediate college for girls and Govt high school for boys. In addition there are many Montessori and English medium schools and two girls college in private sector.

Govt. Higher Secondary School for boys
It is one of the oldest high school of Sialkot District. this is serving almost 24 villages and towns in surrounding of Kolti Loharan. Many famous national and local personalities got their education from here and serving in Pakistan and Overseas.

Hospitals
There was  Rural Health Center (RHC) level hospital situated between Kotli Loharan East and West for easy approach. Since 2015 it has been upgraded to Tehsil headquarters (THQ) hospital with new building and more facilities according to THQ level.

References
 K Conboy, "Elite Forces of India and Pakistan" ,
 Weatherbase: Historical Weather for Sialkot, Pakistan (English). Weatherbase (2008).
 Government of Sialkot (Union Council Kotli Loharan )

External links
https://web.archive.org/web/20100721202304/http://www.sialkot.gov.pk/

See also
Sialkot
Kotli loharan East
Kharota Syedan

Cities and towns in Sialkot District